Rani Chandra is a fictional character played by Anjli Mohindra in the British children's science fiction television programme The Sarah Jane Adventures, a spin-off from the long-running series Doctor Who. She first appeared in The Day of the Clown.

Conception
Rani was introduced into The Sarah Jane Adventures as a replacement for departing character Maria Jackson, played by Yasmin Paige. Paige left the series as a regular due to her wanting to complete her GCSEs, thus, Maria moved to America because her father had been offered a job there.
Rani's parents, Haresh and Gita Chandra, replace Maria's parents, Alan and Chrissie Jackson, as Alan departs with their daughter and Chrissie no longer has reason to show up.

Rani shares her name with the Rani, a recurring villain from the classic series of Doctor Who.  Russell T Davies told readers of Doctor Who Magazine that Rani is "not the Rani".

Appearances

Television
Rani first appears in the second story of Series 2, following Maria's departure. In The Day of the Clown (2008), Rani and her parents move into the Jacksons' old house at 12 Bannerman Road(sometimes 36 Bannerman Road), opposite Sarah Jane (Elisabeth Sladen) and Luke Smith's (Tommy Knight) house, in Ealing, London. Her father is the new headteacher of the school where she, Luke and his best friend Clyde Langer (Daniel Anthony) are pupils; her mother owns the Bloomin' Lovely florist. An aspiring journalist, Rani soon joins Sarah Jane's investigative gang.

In the Series 3 premiere Prisoner of the Judoon (2009), Rani and Clyde are banned by extraterrestrial police force the Judoon from space travel as punishment for interference in their work. Although grounded on her terrestrial homeworld, she is nobility of an unspecified alien planet. A humanoid child monarch known as Gavin creates her Lady Rani in appreciation of her assistance in his succession which also saved the whole of humanity. Coincidentally, she is continually addressed as Lady Rani in the subsequent serial, when she is transported to the court of Queen Jane and mistaken for a newly summoned lady-in-waiting.

The Series 3-story The Mad Woman in the Attic focuses on Rani. Sarah Jane discovers that, in violation of her rules, Rani has shared her adventures in letters to her former school friend Samuel; the events of the episode cause two timelines to occur, one where in 2059, Rani has acquired Sarah Jane's home at 13 Bannerman Road and become miserable and alone, and another where she will have a son and grandchildren and still friends with Luke and even her predecessor, Maria, living with her family at the former Smith home. Rani's final appearance comes in the last episode of the programme, The Man Who Never Was (2011).

Rani makes a further appearance in "Farewell, Sarah Jane" (2020), an epilogue for the series where years after the events of the main series, she becomes a full time journalist and is writing a story for a project at the North Pole. She finds out that Sarah Jane has died and along with Clyde and Luke, organise her funeral where everyone is celebrating her life. Rani chooses to believe that Sarah Jane did not pass away but rather went with the Doctor to travel the universe, forever.

Audio
Since 2022, Mohindra has reprised Rani in several Doctor Who audio drama spin-offs. She first appears in "The Turn of the Tides", a story from The Eighth of March 2: Protectors of Time boxset from Big Finish Productions and later in three episodes of Doctor Who: Redacted, a ten-part podcast drama from BBC Sounds featuring the Thirteenth Doctor (Jodie Whittaker).

Mohindra is set to reprise Rani in her own audio spin-off series, Rani Takes on the World, set 15 years after the events of The Sarah Jane Adventures. It will feature Daniel Anthony and Mina Anwar returning Clyde Langer and Rani's mother Gita Chandra, respectively. The first of two boxsets, titled Beyond Bannerman Road, is due to release in April 2023.

Additionally, Rani has appeared in several The Sarah Jane Adventures audiobook stories released between 2008 and 2011.

Characterisation
The official The Sarah Jane Adventures website offers the following description of Rani Chandra:

In an interview for SFX, Mohindra asserts that Rani and Maria are only similar in the extent that they are both girls, live in the same house and "[i]n personality terms...[they are] both quite strong-willed", although she notes that there are "a lot less tears from Rani than there were from Maria." She describes Rani's relationship with Sarah Jane as "a lot different" to that between Sarah Jane and Maria. Mohindra notes that Rani is "very much an apprentice of Sarah Jane...[although] at first...Sarah Jane is not really that interested in taking on another child." Rani shadows Sarah Jane and copies her behaviour to help her deal with a situation. She is keen on fighting mentally as opposed to physically and Mohindra likes the fact that Rani is "a girl between two guys at times".

Reception
Reviewing the second series of The Sarah Jane Adventures for Digital Spy, Ben Rawson-Jones writes that: "As Rani, Anjli Mohindra was fine with dialogue, but painfully self-conscious on a physical acting level when compared to the effortless ease with which Daniel Anthony and Tommy Knight portray Clyde and Luke. It was almost as if someone was stood slightly off set operating her with strings. That theory at least fits into the whole 'body possession' procession of the second season."

Following Rani's first appearance, Michael Bush writes for Den of Geek: "Rani is another asset to the fledgling cast: a gabby young journalist whose inquisitive nature leads to a run in with alien foes. Comparisons between Rani and Sarah Jane's former companion Maria are almost inevitable, and bound to be divisive, but – based on this episode, at least – Mohindra gives as good as she takes, and her character manages to be interesting and endearing without treading on Miss Jackson's toes."

References

External links

Television characters introduced in 2008
The Sarah Jane Adventures characters
Female characters in television
Fictional people from London
Teenage characters in television
Fictional Indian people